Prince Aly Muhammad Aga Khan (born March 7, 2000) is a British cinematographer, the fourth child of Aga Khan IV and his second wife, Gabriele Renate Homey.

Early life and education 
Aly Muhammad Aga Khan was born on March 7, 2000, in Paris, France. His father, current Nizari Ismailis Imam Karim Aga Khan, is the founder and chairman of the Aga Khan Development Network. His mother, Gabriele Renate Homey, a member of the Thyssen family, is a lawyer of German descent. His paternal grandmother was Joan Yarde-Buller, daughter of John Yarde-Buller, 3rd Baron Churston.

From his father's first marriage to Sarah Croker-Poole, Aly has three older half-siblings; Zahra, Rahim, and Hussain. From his mother's first marriage to Prince Karl Emich of Leiningen, he has an older half-sister, Theresa. Much of his childhood was spent in Europe, where he completed secondary education. In September 2019, he commenced an undergraduate study at Harvard University in Cambridge, Massachusetts.

Career 
He directed the 2018 short film "Close To Home," shot in Gilgit-Baltistan, part of the conflict-torn state of Kashmir, subject to a United Nations Security Council dispute, and freedom struggle. The movie which documents the plight of a poverty stricken community plagued by natural disasters, was screened at Jubilee Arts International Film Festival in Lisbon, Portugal. While speaking at the University of Central Asia, in Kyrgyzstan, Prince Aly said he would "plan to continue adding to the "Close to Home" series, in the hope that these films will help shed light on issues that I believe are important to young people today.”

In 2018, after turning 18, Prince Aly gave an opening speech at Pecaut Square, Toronto for the 34th annual, World Partnership Walk, organized by the Aga Khan Foundation, which raised over CA$6 million. While speaking on the foundations efforts in alleviating poverty in conflict stricken Kashmir, Prince Aly stated, "one thing we cannot ignore, and that is climate change and its long lasting effects on the people living in these regions."

Prince Aly in October 2018, visited Gilgit Baltistan Hunza district, to oversee rural development projects, relating to education and health care by the Aga Khan Foundation. On his arrival at Islamabad airport, he was publicly greeted by Hafiz Sherali, President of the Ismaili National Council for Pakistan.

In 2020, Prince Aly released the feature length documentary "Al-Khimyah," which explores the work of the Aga Khan Historic Cities Programme in Cairo. The documentary shines a spotlight on the 30-hectare Al-Azhar Park — converted from a mound of rubble — and the stories of local residents of the adjacent al-Darb al-Ahmar neighbourhood.

References

External links
"Close to Home" Official Movie Website
"Close to Home" Official Movie Instagram

2000 births
Living people
People from Paris
French film directors
British film directors
Noorani family
French people of Iranian descent
French people of Pakistani descent
French people of German descent
British people of Iranian descent
British people of Pakistani descent
British people of German descent